Francesco Malatesta (5 June 1907 – 16 September 1986) was an Italian cyclist. He competed in the tandem event at the 1928 Summer Olympics.

References

External links
 

1907 births
1986 deaths
Italian male cyclists
Olympic cyclists of Italy
Cyclists at the 1928 Summer Olympics
Sportspeople from Padua
Cyclists from the Province of Padua